André Golke (born 15 August 1964) is a German former professional footballer who played as an attacking midfielder or forward.

Honours
VfB Stuttgart
 DFL-Supercup: 1992

References

External links
 
 

1964 births
Living people
German footballers
Footballers from Hamburg
Association football midfielders
Association football forwards
FC St. Pauli players
1. FC Nürnberg players
VfB Stuttgart players
VfB Lübeck players
Bundesliga players
2. Bundesliga players
German football managers
VfB Lübeck managers